National Class Category Up to 785 ccm is a 1979 Yugoslav comedy film directed by Goran Marković.

Plot
A young man from the suburbs of Belgrade, Floyd, a car racer in the national class, in accordance with his passion, is also considered a great lover. But it is not in line with his ambitions to continue racing in the national class. In order to move to a higher class, he must win an important race, and to succeed in this he must postpone his military service. Mile, a kidney patient, who goes to check-ups instead of him, serves him for that. However, it fails, as does avoiding marriage with the "official" girlfriend Šilja, who has become pregnant. In the end, he loses the race, loses his freedom, but gains a friend - only Mile comes to see him off to the army.

Cast 
 Dragan Nikolić - Brana 'Floyd'
 Bogdan Diklić - Mile
 Gorica Popović - Silja
 Rade Marković - Moma
 Olivera Marković - Smilja
 Milivoje Tomić - Strahinja 
 Bora Todorović - Zika
 Vojislav Brajović - Papi 
 Aleksandar Berček - Bunjuel
 Maja Lalević - Senka
 Dragomir Felba - Rade
 Ana Krasojević - Siljina majka
 Danilo Stojković - Cabor

References

External links 

1979 comedy films
1979 films
Serbian comedy films
Films set in Serbia
Films set in Yugoslavia
Films set in Belgrade
Yugoslav comedy films
Films shot in Belgrade